In Yana, the Touch of Undying is a novel by Michael Shea published in 1985.

Plot summary
In Yana, the Touch of Undying is a novel in which the hero seeks a place where immortality is supposedly available.

Reception
Dave Langford reviewed In Yana, the Touch of Undying for White Dwarf #95, and stated that "witty and erudite, though sometimes confusingly written."

Reviews
Review by Faren Miller (1985) in Locus, #299 December 1985
Review by Algis Budrys (1986) in The Magazine of Fantasy & Science Fiction, April 1986
Review by Don D'Ammassa (1986) in Science Fiction Chronicle, #86 November 1986

References

1985 novels